The 2019 Thailand Open (officially known as the Toyota Thailand Open 2019 for sponsorship reasons) was a badminton tournament which took place at Indoor Stadium Huamark in Bangkok, Thailand, from 30 July to 4 August 2019 and had a total purse of $350,000.

Tournament
The 2019 Thailand Open was the sixteenth tournament of the 2019 BWF World Tour and also part of the Thailand Open championships, which had been held since 1984. This tournament was organized by the Badminton Association of Thailand with sanction from the BWF.

Venue
This international tournament was held at Indoor Stadium Huamark in Bangkok, Thailand.

Point distribution
Below is the point distribution table for each phase of the tournament based on the BWF points system for the BWF World Tour Super 500 event.

Prize money
The total prize money for this tournament was US$355,000. Distribution of prize money was in accordance with BWF regulations.

Men's singles

Seeds

 Kento Momota (withdrew)
 Shi Yuqi (withdrew)
 Chou Tien-chen (champion)
 Chen Long (first round)
 Srikanth Kidambi (second round)
 Kenta Nishimoto (quarter-finals)
 Kanta Tsuneyama (semi-finals)
 Sameer Verma (first round)

Finals

Top half

Section 1

Section 2

Bottom half

Section 3

Section 4

Women's singles

Seeds

 Chen Yufei (champion)
 Nozomi Okuhara (withdrew)
 Akane Yamaguchi (withdrew)
 P. V. Sindhu (withdrew)
 He Bingjiao (second round)
 Ratchanok Intanon (final)
 Saina Nehwal (second round)
 Sung Ji-hyun (second round)

Finals

Top half

Section 1

Section 2

Bottom half

Section 3

Section 4

Men's doubles

Seeds

 Marcus Fernaldi Gideon / Kevin Sanjaya Sukamuljo (quarter-finals)
 Takeshi Kamura / Keigo Sonoda (first round)
 Li Junhui / Liu Yuchen (final)
 Mohammad Ahsan / Hendra Setiawan (first round)
 Hiroyuki Endo / Yuta Watanabe (semi-finals)
 Fajar Alfian / Muhammad Rian Ardianto (second round)
 Han Chengkai / Zhou Haodong (second round)
 Liao Min-chun / Su Ching-heng (first round)

Finals

Top half

Section 1

Section 2

Bottom half

Section 3

Section 4

Women's doubles

Seeds

 Mayu Matsumoto / Wakana Nagahara (quarter-finals)
 Yuki Fukushima / Sayaka Hirota (second round)
 Misaki Matsutomo / Ayaka Takahashi (quarter-finals)
 Chen Qingchen / Jia Yifan (withdrew)
 Greysia Polii / Apriyani Rahayu (quarter-finals)
 Lee So-hee / Shin Seung-chan (semi-finals)
 Shiho Tanaka / Koharu Yonemoto (champions)
 Du Yue / Li Yinhui (final)

Finals

Top half

Section 1

Section 2

Bottom half

Section 3

Section 4

Mixed doubles

Seeds

 Zheng Siwei / Huang Yaqiong (withdrew)
 Wang Yilü / Huang Dongping (champions)
 Yuta Watanabe / Arisa Higashino (final)
 Dechapol Puavaranukroh / Sapsiree Taerattanachai (semi-finals)
 Chan Peng Soon / Goh Liu Ying (first round)
 Hafiz Faizal / Gloria Emanuelle Widjaja (second round)
 Praveen Jordan / Melati Daeva Oktavianti (second round)
 Tang Chun Man / Tse Ying Suet (semi-finals)

Finals

Top half

Section 1

Section 2

Bottom half

Section 3

Section 4

References

External links
 Tournament Link

Thailand Open
Badminton, World Tour, Thailand Open
Badminton, World Tour, Thailand Open
2019
Badminton, World Tour, Thailand Open
Badminton, World Tour, Thailand Open